The Last Trapper is a 2006 French documentary film directed by Nicolas Vanier. It follows a trapper in Yukon, Canada.

Synopsis 
In the heart of the Rocky Mountains of the Canadian Yukon, in the depths of the high altitude, Norman is a musher trapper who lives in the most solitary, traditional way possible, with Nebraska, a Nahanni Native American, her two horses and her seven hitching dogs. Husky. He gives himself the role of monitoring nature and regulating species.

Disconnected from the desires created by modern society, they feed on the products of hunting and fishing. Norman lives in self-sufficiency and makes his own huts, snowshoes, sled, canoe and all he needs with the wood and bark taken from the forest, and Nebraska tanned the old-fashioned leather.

Once a year, in the spring, Norman makes a trip to the nearest cities of Whitehorse or Dawson City to sell about 150 skins and furs of lynx, beavers, martens, otters, wolves, foxes, caribou, elk ... and buy the little he needs: flour, matches, candles, tobacco, batteries for his transistor, tools, medicine, shotgun and ammunition.

The Last Trapper brings together the strong moments that can live such a man for a year, beyond sleigh rides in the coldness of winter can reach almost -55 °C, canoeing down a torrent set in a canyon, grizzly bear and wolf attacks and encounters with characters with an extraordinary lifestyle.

References

External links 

2006 documentary films
2006 films
French documentary films
Films directed by Nicolas Vanier
2000s survival films
French survival films
2000s French films